Bjarne Jensen (born 16 April 1959) is a Danish former footballer who played as a defender. Jensen continues to hold the record of most appearances for Brøndby IF with 556, of which 402 were in the Danish leagues. He continued as a manager after his playing career.

Club career
Jensen spent all 14 seasons of his playing career with Brøndby IF before retiring at age 33 in 1992. From his senior debut in 1978, where the club competed in the 2nd Division (second-tier) until his retirement, Jensen won 5 Danish championships and 1 Danish Cup. He won the award of Brøndby Player of the Year twice; in 1984 and 1988, while also winning Danish Player of the Year in the latter. Jensen played his final Brøndby game in November 1992, before ending his career. He still holds Brøndby IF's record of most appearances with 556 senior games, in which he scored 32 goals.

International career
Jensen gained four caps for the Denmark national team, in which he scored no goals.

Honours

Brøndby
1st Division(): 1985, 1987, 1988, 1990, 1991
2nd Division(): 1981
Danish Cup: 1988–89
Danish League Cup(): 1984

References

1959 births
Living people
People from Brøndby Municipality
Brøndby IF players
Danish men's footballers
Denmark international footballers
Danish Superliga players
Danish 1st Division players
Association football defenders
Danish football managers
Brønshøj BK managers
Hvidovre IF managers
FC Helsingør managers
Brøndby IF non-playing staff
Sportspeople from the Capital Region of Denmark